Ferreira is a municipality in the province of Granada, Spain. In 2010, it had a population of 338.

References

Municipalities in the Province of Granada